Huntington Township, Ohio, may refer to:

Huntington Township, Brown County, Ohio
Huntington Township, Gallia County, Ohio
Huntington Township, Lorain County, Ohio
Huntington Township, Ross County, Ohio

Ohio township disambiguation pages